The Bajaj Wind125 is a standard street motorcycle by Bajaj Auto designed for the middle class Indian urban rider. In the Philippines, it is designed for tricycle and delivery business. It is now no longer in production for the Indian market, though the bike is made for the export market.

Overview
The Bajaj Wind125 is Kawasaki's entry into the South East Asian markets such as Thailand, Taiwan, and Indonesia where the entry level bike is a 125 CC (not 100 CC as in India) and where the consumer desires a modicum of performance along with mileage. After its discontinuation within an year or two of its launch, Its design-outlook was somehow reused in 2006 with a 100 CC engine and under the name Platina.

Wind 125
Standard motorcycles